Anchicremna is a genus of moths belonging to the subfamily Tortricinae of the family Tortricidae.

Species
Anchicremna eulidias Meyrick, 1926
Anchicremna uncinata Razowski & Wojtusiak, 2010

See also
List of Tortricidae genera

References

 , 1926: Exotic Microlepidoptera. Exotic Microlepidoptera 3(8): 225-256. 
 , 2010: Tortricidae (Lepidoptera) from Peru. Acta Zoologica Cracoviensia 53B (1-2): 73-159. . Full article: .

External links
tortricidae.com

Sparganothini
Tortricidae genera